Aleksandr Yefremov is the name of:
 Aleksandr Yefremov (politician) (1904–1951), Soviet politician, head of Moscow from 1938 to 1939
 Alexander P. Yefremov, Russian physicist